The 1989 Pepsi 300 was an endurance race for Group 3A Touring Cars. This was the 11th and last touring car endurance race held at Oran Park.

The race was won by Andrew Miedecke and Andrew Bagnall driving a Ford Sierra RS500. Second was the BMW M3 of Brett Riley and Ludwig Finauer, while veteran Murray Carter finished third in his Sierra.

1988 race winner Peter Brock qualified on pole in his Mobil 1 Racing Sierra, but was out of the race after only 13 laps with a suspected blown head gasket, though not before setting the fastest lap of the race. Formula Ford driver Mark Larkham was to be Brock's co-driver in the race.

Results
Results were as follows:

Statistics
 Pole Position - 1:11.32 - #05 Peter Brock
 Fastest Lap - 1:13.08 - #05 Peter Brock

See also
1989 Australian Touring Car season

References

Pepsi 300